Systemisch is a 1994 album by the German glitch group Oval. It was released in 1994 by Mille Plateaux.

Breaking away from the instrumental format of previous work, the album used sound taken from deliberately damaged CDs to combine an experimental glitch aesthetic with an accessible pop sensibility.  This new approach gave Oval their first major critical attention. In its development of the glitch aesthetic in electronic music, Systemisch influenced the sound of artists such as Autechre and Björk, who sampled the track Aero Deck in the song "Unison", from the album Vespertine.

Track listing

Notes and references

Oval (musical project) albums
Glitch (music) albums
1994 albums